Delta is a home rule municipality that is the county seat and the most populous municipality of Delta County, Colorado, United States. The town population was 9,035 at the 2020 United States Census. The United States Forest Service headquarters of the Grand Mesa, Gunnison, and Uncompahgre National Forests are located in Delta.

History
Delta was built as a trading post for the Ute people and early settlers. Fort Uncompahgre was built in 1828.

The town was named because of its location on the delta where the Uncompahgre River flows into the Gunnison River. The town was incorporated in 1882.

Geography
Delta is located in southwestern Delta County at  (38.740879, -108.063423). The downtown area is situated south of the Gunnison River and east of the Uncompahgre River. The city limits extend north across the Gunnison into the area now known as "North Delta", then west  along U.S. Route 50 as far as Westwinds Airport.

At the 2020 United States Census, the town had a total area of  including  of water.

Delta is part of the Colorado Western Slope region.

Demographics

As of the census of 2010, there were 8,915 people, 3,530 households, and 2,337 families living in the city. The racial makeup of the city was 82.2% White, 0.2% African American, 1.1% Native American, 0.7% Asian, 12.5% from other races, and 3.1% from two or more races. Hispanic or Latino of any race were 26.1% of the population.

There were 3,530 households, out of which 30.3% had children under the age of 18 living with them, 49.3% were married couples living together, 11.6% had a female householder with no husband present, and 33.8% were non-families. 30.0% of all households were made up of individuals, and 14.8% had someone living alone who was 65 years of age or older.  The average household size was 2.49, and the average family size was 3.08.

In the city, the population was spread out, with 26.7% under the age of 18, 8.2% from 18 to 24, 23.2% from 25 to 44, 24.5% from 45 to 64, and 17.5% who were 65 years of age or older.  The median age was 38.0 years. For every 100 females, there were 93.8 males.  For every 100 females age 18 and over, there were 91.0 males.

Art and culture

Fort Uncompahgre was built in 1828, established as a fur trading post by Antoine Robidoux. Tour guides dress in period attire and trap beavers, make buckskins, knap arrowheads, and work the forge.

Tourism
Parks:
 Pow Wow Arbor
 Mountain View Pavilion
 Riley Pavilion / Cleland Park
 Shade Pavilion Island 
 Cottonwood Park
 Emerald Hills Park
 From the city, one can see the Grand Mesa Mountain range. It is the largest flat-topped mountain in the world.

Media
The principal newspaper is the Delta County Independent, which is published weekly on Wednesdays. Local readers also enjoy The High Country Shopper, a free paper that distributes over 15,000 copies throughout the county. They also have a Facebook page that anyone could follow.

Infrastructure

Transportation
Delta is part of Colorado's Bustang network. It is on the Durango-Grand Junction Outrider line.

Major highways
 U.S. Highway 50 runs east-west, crossing 12 states and linking Sacramento, California, with Ocean City, Maryland. In Colorado, it passes through Delta as Main Street and connects the city to Montrose, Grand Junction and Pueblo.
 State Highway 65 is a  stretch that runs north from State Highway 92 east of Delta, over the Grand Mesa, to Interstate 70 near Palisade.
 State Highway 92 begins in Delta, at the intersection of Main Street and First Street. It runs  to the east, re-encountering US 50 near Blue Mesa Reservoir and Curecanti National Recreation Area.

Health care
Delta County Memorial Hospital serves the city and the surrounding area. In addition to the main hospital, seven specialty clinics are available.
In April 2021 a COVID-19 outbreak occurred among the Delta Police Department. This incident happened four months after COVID-19 vaccinations became available to all first responders in Colorado free of charge.

Schools
Delta is part of the Delta County School District, which also includes Cedaredge, Crawford, Hotchkiss, and Paonia. The school district serves 4,792 students as of the 2020-2021 academic year.

Notable people
Chuck Cottier, baseball player and manager
Dale Ishimoto, American actor
Frank H. Ono, Medal of Honor recipient
Matt Soper, Colorado Representative, House District 54
Felix L. Sparks, Colorado Supreme Court justice, U.S. Army colonel, Colorado Army National Guard brigadier general

See also

Colorado
Bibliography of Colorado
Index of Colorado-related articles
Outline of Colorado
List of counties in Colorado
List of municipalities in Colorado
List of places in Colorado

References

Further reading
 Borowsky, Larry and Cleary, Brooke, "Delta's King of Kings: The Egyptian Theatre and the Bank Night Craze". Colorado Heritage Summer 2002: pp. 2–15
 Ferguson, Olivia Spalding, "A Sketch of Delta County History". The Colorado Magazine 5 (October 1928): pp. 161–164

External links

City of Delta website
CDOT map of the City of Delta
Delta Area Chamber of Commerce
Delta County Independent

Cities in Delta County, Colorado
County seats in Colorado
Colorado Western Slope
Gunnison River
Cities in Colorado